is a United States Army post located in the cities of Zama and Sagamihara, in Kanagawa Prefecture, Japan, about  southwest of Tokyo.

Camp Zama is home to the U.S. Army Japan (USARJ), I Corps (Forward), U.S. Army Aviation Battalion Japan "Ninjas", 311th Military Intelligence Battalion, Japan Engineer District (U.S. Army Corps of Engineers), 78th Signal Battalion and the Bilateral Coordination Department and 4th Engineer Group of the Japan Ground Self-Defense Force.

Camp
Camp Zama is close to the Sagami River near the foothills of the Tanzawa Mountain Range, Kanagawa Prefecture. The installation falls in the Zama City limits while the two housing areas, Camp Zama and Sagamihara Family Housing Area (SFHA), are located in the adjacent Sagamihara City. Once considered rural, this area has transformed into an urban area. New housing developments and communities along with shopping centers have increased the population and made traffic extremely congested.

Traveling from Tokyo and outlying U.S. military installations to Camp Zama averages from 1.5 to 3 hours depending on the time of day. However traveling from other parts of Kanagawa was made easier with the opening of the nearby Sagamihara/Aikawa Interchange which connects with the Ken-Ō Expressway in May 2012.

The closest train station to Camp Zama is the Odakyū Line's Sōbudai-mae Station.

History
Camp Zama is located on the former site of the Imperial Japanese Army Academy, which was named "Sōbudai" by Emperor Showa. Camp Zama is the earliest barrack in Japan. The camp faced many changes as a result of the defeat suffered by the Japanese in World War II. Route 51 is the road to Camp Zama that was specifically built in order for the Emperor to travel to review the graduating classes from Machida Station. The Emperor Showa visited Camp Zama in 1937. Camp Zama also houses an emergency shelter for the Emperor, and to this day, it has been maintained by the U.S. Army Garrison Japan. The Camp Zama theater workshop is one of the few remaining buildings from the pre-occupation era. It is a large hall that was used for ceremonies by the Imperial Japanese Army.  Additionally, the former recreation center still stands currently used by the Camp Zama Tours and Travel Office and Boys Scouts, along with others.

In November 1984, Mother Teresa of Calcutta visited Camp Zama and spoke to an audience of 1,200 people.

The camp has been attacked several times by terrorists. First when a bomb was exploded outside the camp in 2002 by the "Revolutionary Army". There was a further attack in 2007, which was speculated to be an Al-Qaida attack but responsibility was claimed by so-called "Revolutionary Army" responsible for the 2002 attack. There was another attempted attack in May 2015. A suspect was formally arrested in December 2018.

In 2004 Charles Jenkins, a U.S. Army sergeant who had deserted to North Korea in 1965, turned himself into Camp Zama. He was sentenced to a 30-day jail sentence and given a dishonourable discharge. He later gained permanent residency in Japan to live with his Japanese wife and family. Jenkins died of heart failure at age 77 in December 2017 near Sado, in Northern Japan.

In 2005 a live anthrax sample was sent to the base in error. It was destroyed in 2009.

In March 2007, Michael Jackson visited the camp to greet 3,000 plus U.S. troops and their families. Jackson was flown in on a Black Hawk helicopter from Hardy Barracks in Tokyo and addressed the frenzied crowd at the base's Yano Fitness Center gymnasium:

"It is an honor and privilege to be here today."  Michael told the spectators.  "Those of you in here today are some of the most special people in the world because you have chosen a life of service.  When we all sleep at night, we rest comfortably knowing that we are protected.  And it is because of you here today and others who so valiantly have given their lives to protect us, that we enjoy our freedom.  I thank you from the bottom of my heart.  I love you.  Thank you so much."

Col. Robert M. Waltemeyer, Commander U.S. Army Garrison Japan, presented Jackson with a Certificate of Appreciation for his devotion to U.S. Military troops and their families.

In December 2007 headquarters for the 1st Corps was opened at Camp Zama.

Personnel from the base assisted with Operation Tomodachi following and during the March 2011 Tōhoku earthquake and tsunami and Fukushima I nuclear accidents. During the crisis, around 300 American family members voluntarily departed the base for locations outside Japan.

In 2013 a handgun went missing at the base, and was reported to police.

Education 
The United States Department of Defense operates several public schools in the base.
 Arnn Elementary School
 Zama Middle High School

Higher educational opportunities for those in the military and working for the Department of Defense, as well as for family members at Camp Zama are available through several contracted academic institutions. For example:
 University of Maryland University College
 Central Texas College

Arnn Elementary School 
The Sagamihara Elementary School opened in September 1951 with 300 students, ten teachers, and a principal. It started in a building purchased from the Japanese Government. This original building was destroyed by fire in 1975. Three temporary buildings were constructed in the summer of 1976 on the community play area across the street from the original school site. Later in 1978 three new buildings were completed on the original site and the campus was completed in 1983. These buildings served as the school until the new school replacement project was completed in May 2003. Fall 2003, the new John O. Arnn ES opened.

 School motto: "Creating lifelong learners"
 School mascot: The Knight
 School colors: Blue and green

Zama American High School

The Zama American High School, also known as ZAHS, first opened in 1959. It was opened to, and continues to serve, American dependents of U.S. Military and civilian employees stationed in the area, as well as U.S. Contractors. It was built at the bottom of "General's Hill" on the north side of Camp Zama and remained there until 1968. In 1968, the school Principal, Mr. Richard A. Pemble, had the high school and Jr. High 'switched', and the high school then occupied two wooden army barracks close to the main gate. The barracks were the original Imperial Japanese Army buildings used to house Japanese Imperial army officer candidates during World War II, and subsequently house U.S. troops during the occupation.

In 1980, a new high school was built on the hill near the original site, and the historical barracks were subsequently torn down. The high school still serves the American School community for the U.S. dependents in the Camp Zama, Sagamihara, Atsugi Naval Air Facility and surrounding areas.

In 1987, the school split into Zama American Middle School and Zama American High School.

ZAHS has an active alumni association and biyearly reunions that draw members from all over the globe.

Zama American High School celebrated its 50th graduating class anniversary in June 2009.
In June 2012, the school was placed on accreditation probation by accreditation agency AdvancED.  AdvancED's report cited an "obstructive and negative climate perpetuated by an intimidating, manipulative minority of staff members at the school" as the main source of problems with the learning environment at the school.  In fear of losing its accreditation, school staff had until April 2013 to correct the problem. In response, in April 2012, DoDEA called former Zama High School teacher Bruce Derr out of retirement to serve as principal and turn things around. In August 2012 DoDEA transferred union representative Brian Chance, identified as one of those reportedly contributing to the conflicts between faculty and administrators at the school, to Germany.  One teacher was fired.  Six other teachers were also transferred or elected to retire in lieu of accepting a transfer.  The school met the deadline and is again fully accredited.

In 2012 the DoDEA boss agreed that Zama High School was failing and believed it should receive a D−.  According to the 2012 Report of the Quality Assurance Review Team's report SAT scores and other data is not easily accessible to the parents and the public.

In 2016, Zama American Middle School was found to have asbestos and is currently under construction prompting the middle school children be moved to the high school building temporarily.

In 2017, Zama High School combined with Zama Middle School, making Zama American Middle High School.
 
In 2013, Zama American High School students scored an average SAT Test Score of 1339 points, obtaining a 442 in critical reading, 465 in math, and 432 in writing,

References

External links
Zama Alumni Association Website
Zama American High School Official Website (public)
USARJ and I Corps (Forward) Web site
Camp Zama at globalsecurity.org
Site dedicated to alumni of Camp Zama American High School. Pictures, artifacts, history, memorabilia, etc.
Yearbooks on-line: Zama American High School yearbooks online – all yearbooks from the first year the school opened in 1959 to 2000.
The Official 1956th Communications Group/374th Communications Squadron, Operation Location – C Alumni Website.

Zama
Transport in Kanagawa Prefecture
Heliports in Japan
Buildings and structures in Sagamihara
Buildings and structures in Kanagawa Prefecture